Buddy Rogers Arrington (July 26, 1938 – August 2, 2022) was an American NASCAR Winston Cup Series driver and owner.

Racing career 

Arrington has the second-most starts without a win, and finished in the top 10 of NASCAR points twice; in 1978 (ninth) and 1982 (seventh). Arrington was loyal to his Mopar cars and engines, as he ran Chryslers and Dodges until 1985 (Chrysler stopped production of raceable body styles in 1983 and they became ineligible two years later) when the company stopped supporting them. His best career race and finish was at Talladega in 1979, where he had a powerful enough car to lead a few laps towards the end, and finished third. Arrington finished one lap ahead of Richard Petty, driving one of Petty's cast-off Dodge Magnums that were left when Petty abandoned Mopar and began driving General Motors vehicles a year earlier, and several other top NASCAR drivers. Arrington almost always ran his own car, and his operation was a very money-conscious effort. His pit crew were almost always unpaid volunteers, and he relied heavily (and almost exclusively) on used equipment with Petty's old Magnums being his primary cars. Since Arrington could not afford new cars, his team would have to reconfigure the Petty cars and re-skin them into Dodge Miradas or Chrysler Imperials for a 1981 rule change.

Arrington's two Chrysler Imperials were the last Chrysler products to run in the NASCAR Winston Cup series. He ran the car at first in two races in the 1981 season, and in more races (alternating with Dodge Miradas) until April 1985, when at that point the parts supply, even used, for Chrysler products (Chrysler factory support ended in late 1978) dried up.  He sold one of the Imperials (purchased from Cecil Gordon in 1984) to Phil Goode in April 1985 (Goode raced it till the end of the 1985 season), and his other Imperial was given to the NASCAR Hall of Fame at Talladega, Alabama. Arrington was always a much-liked man on the NASCAR circuit, and other teams and a small, but loyal fan club pitched in to help keep him racing. In 1985 the generosity of rising NASCAR star driver Bill Elliott (who sold Buddy his slightly used Ford Thunderbird race cars and parts on the cheap) kept Arrington driving until 1988. Buddy's son Joey Arrington (who at the age of 17 served on Buddy's pit crew, and built up his engines), now runs Arrington Manufacturing in Martinsville, Virginia. The company builds racing engines (mostly Dodges) for the Craftsman Truck Series, and test engines for Nextel Cup Nationwide series cars.  Buddy Arrington was a regular visitor to his son's company, and often offered advice to young (mostly Dodge) drivers trying to make it in NASCAR racing.

Arrington is a noted figure in NASCAR and Mopar history. He began professional NASCAR racing in December 1963 behind the wheel of his Dodge hardtop, and for the next twenty-five years, he never missed a season; finally retiring from the sport in 1988. What made Arrington unique in the history of the sport was his absolute dedication and loyalty to Chrysler, and his positive attitude in spite of what often seemed like insurmountable odds. Being the team owner and driver, Arrington drove Dodges from 1964 all the way through mid-season 1985. In 1984 and 1985, his Chrysler Imperial became the last Chrysler product in NASCAR until Dodge reentered the sport in 2001. As prolific a racer as Buddy Arrington was, and as popular as he still remains among fans, he never won a single NASCAR race. In his 560 career starts, he mustered fifteen top-five finishes, and his highest points finish was seventh, achieved in 1982. Still, Buddy Arrington never abandoned the Mopar banner until Mopar completely abandoned him and pulled all parts sponsorships in 1985.

Arrington died on August 2, 2022 at the age of 84.

Motorsports career results

NASCAR 
(key) (Bold – Pole position awarded by qualifying time. Italics – Pole position earned by points standings or practice time. * – Most laps led.)

Grand National Series

Winston Cup Series

Daytona 500

References

External links 
 
 

1938 births
2022 deaths
People from Martinsville, Virginia
Racing drivers from Virginia
NASCAR drivers
NASCAR team owners